Wuhletal is a railway station in the Marzahn-Hellersdorf district of Berlin. It is served by the S-Bahn line  and the U-Bahn line .

The station consists of two island platforms paired by direction, with the S-Bahn serving the outer faces of each platform and the U-Bahn the inner faces of the same platforms. This makes interchange between the two modes very easy and is a unique situation in Berlin. At  in length, the platforms are the longest in the Berlin U-Bahn network.

Etymology
The Wuhletal is a green corridor in the northeastern Berlin district of Marzahn-Hellersdorf on the River Wuhle, from which it also has its name. The park was established after the decommissioning of the Falkenberg sewage treatment plant from 2002, which had previously used the Wuhle as receiving water. The closure of the sewage treatment plant was considered critical by environmentalists because of the expected fall in the groundwater level in the landscape park area.

The Wuhletalwächter is a six-sided, 15.5 meter high concrete climbing tower with about 500 m² climbing area and a boulder wall around the climbing tower (about 400 m²), located at the northern end of the Wuhletal. The AlpinClub Berlin, a section of the German Alpine Club, exercises its house right here.

At the merger of Marzahn and Hellersdorf, "Wuhletal" was at times discussed as the district name. This name is used by the district associations of parties and sub-organizations that supported this proposal (CDU and FDP) for the district.

History
The plan for the station began in the 1980s where the station was built as Kaulsdorf-West, under the eastern extension of the former line E to develop the large housing estate Hellersdorf and together with the other stations of the route to Hönow on 1 July 1989 opened. The station is located on the embankment of the existing S-Bahn on the route of the Prussian Eastern Railway, which crosses here used for the subway VnK Railway. The railway embankment is underpassed by the Wuhle and two pedestrian tunnels.

References

External links

Wuhletal
U5 (Berlin U-Bahn) stations
Wuhletal
Railway stations in Germany opened in 1989
1989 establishments in East Germany